McGuinn is an Irish surname originating in Longford. Notable people with the surname include:

Bob McGuinn, New Zealand rugby league player
Jim McGuinn (born 1966), American radio personality
Mark McGuinn (born 1968), American musician
Roger McGuinn (born 1942), American singer-songwriter and guitarist

References